Ezekiel Akinyemi (born November 25, 1984), better known by his stage name DJ Zeke, is a professional DJ from the New York metropolitan area. He is most well known for playing the ones and twos at parties in the five boroughs of NYC as well as DJing events for his alma mater, St. John's University. However, due to his increasing popularity in recent years, DJ Zeke has done more corporate events for the likes of Apple, Crain and PwC.

Red Bull Thre3style 

On 14 January 2013, DJ Zeke was selected to participate in the esteemed Red Bull Thre3style Contest, a global DJ competition hosted by the popular energy drink company that "pits some of the top DJs from around the world against each other." On 1 February 2013, DJ Zeke was crowned the winner of New York's Thre3style competition. He would go on to lose in the regional qualifier in Philadelphia.

The Get Down 

On 12 August 2016, DJ Zeke took part in the Netflix Original series The Get Down. DJ Zeke took on the role of mentoring Shameik Moore in DJing for the role.

2020 Virtual Graduations 

In May 2020, DJ Zeke was chosen as the host for St. John's University and Pace University's virtual graduation ceremonies for the class of 2020. The events were broadcast on Instagram Live and occurred due to the COVID-19 pandemic in New York City.

References

1984 births
Living people
African-American DJs
21st-century African-American people
20th-century African-American people